Josh Cowdery (born December 23, 1978) is an American actor. He is known in film for Fantastic Beasts and Where to Find Them (2016) and in television for Agents of S.H.I.E.L.D. (2013) and Legends (2014).

Early life
Cowdery was born on December 23, 1978, in Little Rock, Arkansas. While attending Sylvan Hills High School in Sherwood, Arkansas, he helped form an improv group with close friend Wes Bentley and his brother Patrick, along with Damien Bunting; aptly called B(3) + C. He later graduated from University of Arkansas with a degree in Marketing Management and minors in Acting and Psychology.

Career
In 2012, Cowdery made an appearance in The Avengers. Subsequently, his character crossed over into the MCU TV series Agents of S.H.I.E.L.D. in 2013.

In 2016, he portrayed Henry Shaw Jr. in Fantastic Beasts and Where to Find Them.

Filmography

Film

Television

Video games

References

External links

1978 births
Living people
20th-century American male actors
21st-century American male actors
American male film actors
American male television actors
American male video game actors
American male voice actors
Male actors from Arkansas
People from Sherwood, Arkansas
Sylvan Hills High School alumni